32 Cygni (32 Cyg, Omicron2 Cyg, ο2 Cyg) is the Flamsteed designation for a binary star system in the Cygnus constellation. It is a 4th magnitude star, which can be seen with the naked eye under suitably dark skies. Parallax measurements give an estimated distance of 1,100 light-years (320 parsecs) from the Earth. However, Schröder et al. (2007) suggest the actual value, after correcting for Malmquist bias, may be closer to 1,174 light-years (360 parsecs).  Although it is a spectrsocopic binary with components that cannot be separated visually, it has two entries in the Henry Draper Catalogue, with identical magnitudes and positions, but showing the spectral types of the two components.

The Bayer letter ο has been variously applied to two or three of the stars 30, 31, and 32 Cygni. 32 Cygni has been designated as either ο2 or ο3 Cygni. For clarity, it is preferred to use the Flamsteed designation 32 Cygni rather than one of the Bayer designations.

The primary component in this system, 32 Cygni A, has a stellar classification of K5 Iab, indicating that it is a supergiant star. Its effective temperature of 3,840 K lies in the range for K-type stars, giving it an orange hue. This star has over seven times more than the mass of the Sun and the outer envelope has expanded to about 184 times the Sun's radius. It is radiating 6,600 times the luminosity of the Sun.

The companion star, 32 Cygni B, is smaller than the primary, with four times the Sun's mass and three times the Sun's radius. It has a much higher effective temperature of 16,200 K and is radiating over 300 times the Sun's luminosity. This star has the blue-white hue of a B7 star main sequence star.

The two stars form an eclipsing binary system (variable star designation: V1488 Cyg) similar to Algol. The orbital plane of the two stars is nearly aligned with the line of sight from the Earth, so that the giant star eclipses the secondary component once per orbit. During an eclipse, emission lines can be seen in the spectrum of this system. These originate in the stellar wind escaping from the giant star. In a volume around the B star, this wind becomes ionized, resulting in a circumstellar H II region. The giant star is losing mass at the rate of  times the mass of the Sun per year, or the equivalent of the Sun's mass every 77 million years.

The Washington Double Star Catalog and Catalog of Components of Double and Multiple Stars both list a visual companion 208" distant.  This star is the 8th magnitude A class HD 192933.

References

External links
 http://jumk.de/astronomie/special-stars/32-cygni.shtml

Cygnus (constellation)
Cygni, Omicron2
Cygni, 32
192909
Algol variables
K-type supergiants
B-type main-sequence stars
Bright Star Catalogue objects
099848
BD+47 3059
Cygni, V1488